At the 2004 Summer Olympics in Athens, fifteen events in weightlifting were contested, in eight classes for men and seven for women.  Competition was held in the Nikaia Olympic Weightlifting Hall.

Medalists

Men

Women

Medal table

Participating nations
A total of 249 weightlifters from 79 nations competed at the Athens Games:

Doping
A total of twelve weightlifters were disqualified for doping, amongst them Greek star Leonidas Sabanis, who had won two silver medals in previous Olympics and who had originally been awarded the bronze medal in the Men's 62 kg division.

References

External links
Official result book – Weightlifting

 
Olympic
2004 Summer Olympics events
2004